Laurel Township is one of thirteen townships in Franklin County, Indiana. As of the 2010 census, its population was 1,634.

History
Laurel Township was established in 1845.

Geography
Triple Lakes is in this township.

Cities and towns
 Laurel

Unincorporated towns
 Midway

Adjacent townships
 Columbia Township, Fayette County (north)
 Jackson Township, Fayette County (northeast)
 Blooming Grove Township (east)
 Metamora Township (southeast)
 Salt Creek Township (southwest)
 Posey Township (west)
 Orange Township, Fayette County (northwest)

Major highways
 U.S. Route 52
 Indiana State Road 121

Cemeteries
The township contains three cemeteries: Gobel, Jenks and North.

Education
Laurel Township residents may obtain a free library card from the Franklin County Public Library District in Brookville.

References
 
 United States Census Bureau cartographic boundary files

External links
 Indiana Township Association
 United Township Association of Indiana

Townships in Franklin County, Indiana
Townships in Indiana